Wilderness is an unincorporated community on the border of Orange and Spotsylvania counties in Virginia. The community is centered at the intersection of Virginia primary 20 and Virginia primary 3.

The name likely comes from the nearby thick forest known as The Wilderness Forest, where a Civil War battle nearby known as the Battle of the Wilderness occurred. Locust Grove is the official mailing address for Wilderness.

Pilgrim Baptist Church is a historically Black church in Wilderness, in 1974 Rev. Earl Bledsoe was pastor.

References

Geography of Orange County, Virginia
Geography of Spotsylvania County, Virginia